Perlita Greco (née Alfonsina Grecco Constantini; May 11, 1906, Rosario, Santa Fe, Argentina – February 26, 2001, New York City, New York) was an Argentine-born actress, vedette, tango singer, and cabaret singer.

She became a Spanish citizen in 1930 and U.S. citizen in 1946. She made her U. S. stage debut at the Rainbow Room, New York City.

Selected filmography
 Take Me to Hollywood (1931)

References

External links

1906 births
2001 deaths
Cabaret singers
Tango dancers
Actresses from Rosario, Santa Fe
American film actresses
Argentine film actresses
Argentine people of Greek descent
Argentine people of Italian descent
Argentine vedettes
Spanish film actresses
Singers from Rosario, Santa Fe
Tonadilleras
20th-century Spanish singers
20th-century American actresses
20th-century Spanish women